The 2011 European Women's U-17 Handball Championship was the tenth edition of the European Women's U-17 Handball Championship. It took place in the Czech Republic, in two host cities, Brno and Zlin, from June 23 to July 3. Sixteen teams participated on the tournament, including the fifteen qualifying winners and the host nation. Denmark was the defending champion and reached the final this time as well, but fell short against Russia by a single goal. 

The tournament also served as the qualification for the forthcoming Youth World Championship. Top seven ranked countries have won the right to represent Europe on the event next year, joined by host nation Montenegro.

Venues
Two cities have been selected to host the European championship, Brno and Zlin.

Draw
The draw for the final tournament was held on 8 April 2011 in the EHF headquarters in Vienna, Austria. The teams were allocated to four pots of four, with the eight qualifying group winners put in the first two pots, followed by the host country Czech Republic and the second placed teams in the other two pots.

Preliminary round
The sixteen teams were divided into four groups of 4. Top two teams from each group advanced to the Main round to compete for the 1–8 places, while third and fourth placed teams continued the tournament in the Intermediate round, fighting for the 9–16 places.

Group A

Group B

Group C

Group D

Intermediate round

Group I1

Group I2

Main round

Group M1

Group M2

Placement round 13–16

Bracket

Cross matches

15th place final

13th place final

Placement round 9–12

Bracket

Cross matches

11th place final

9th place final

Placement round 5–8

Bracket

Cross matches

7th place final

5th place final

Final round

Bracket

Semifinals

Bronze medal match

Final

Rankings and awardees

Final ranking

Teams that are advanced to the 2012 World Women's Youth Handball Championship are highlighted with green.

All Star Team
Goalkeeper: 
Left Wing: 
Left Back: 
Playmaker: 
Pivot: 
Right Back: 
Right Wing:

Other awards
Top Scorer: 
Best Defence Player: 
Most Valuable Player: 

Source: euro2011.cz

References

External links
 Official site
 Tournament page on the European Handball Federation official website 

World
Youth
2011 in Czech sport
Handball in the Czech Republic
International sports competitions hosted by the Czech Republic
Youth Handball Championship
Women's handball in the Czech Republic